Freundlich is a surname which may refer to:

Bart Freundlich (born 1970), American film director, screenwriter and producer
Herbert Freundlich (1880–1941), German chemist
Irwin Freundlich (1908-1977), US music teacher and academician
Jeff Lindsay (writer), pen name of Jeffry Freundlich (born 1952), American author 
Otto Freundlich (1878-1943), German artist

See also
Freindlich
Erwin Finlay-Freundlich (1885–1964), German astronomer
Freundlich (crater), a crater on the far side of the Moon named in his honor
Freundlich equation, an adsorption (adhesion of gas or liquid on solid) equation

German-language surnames
Jewish surnames
Yiddish-language surnames